Prickett Lake is a  lake in Houghton County and Baraga County, Michigan. The lake is also known as Prickett Dam Backwater and is surrounded by dense forest. The lake is a reservoir and was created in 1931 by damming the Sturgeon River.

See also 
 List of lakes in Michigan

References

Lakes of Michigan